John Douglas (1830–1911) was an English architect based in Chester, Cheshire. His output included new churches, alterations to and restoration of existing churches, church furnishings, new houses and alterations to existing houses, and a variety of other buildings, including shops, banks, offices, schools, memorials and public buildings. His architectural styles were eclectic, but as he worked during the period of the Gothic Revival, much of his work incorporates elements of the English Gothic style. Douglas is probably best remembered for his incorporation of vernacular elements in his buildings, in particular half-timbering. Of particular importance to Douglas' church furniture is his use of joinery and highly detailed wood carving.

John Douglas was born in the Cheshire village of Sandiway and was articled to the Lancaster architect E. G. Paley, later becoming his chief assistant. He established an office in Chester in either 1855 or 1860, from where he practised throughout his career. Initially he ran the office himself but in 1884 he appointed his assistant, Daniel Porter Fordham, as a partner. When Fordham retired in 1897, he was succeeded by Charles Howard Minshull. In 1909 this partnership was dissolved and Douglas ran the office alone until his death in 1911. As his office was in Chester, most of his works were in Cheshire and North Wales, although some were further afield, in Lancashire, Staffordshire, Warwickshire, and Scotland.

From an early stage in his career, Douglas attracted commissions from wealthy and powerful patrons, the first of which came from Hugh Cholmondeley, 2nd Baron Delamere. His most important patrons were the Grosvenor family of Eaton Hall, namely Richard Grosvenor, 2nd Marquess of Westminster, Hugh Grosvenor, 1st Duke of Westminster, and Hugh Grosvenor, 2nd Duke of Westminster. Douglas designed a large number and variety of buildings in the family's Eaton Hall estate and the surrounding villages. Other important patrons were William Molyneux, 4th Earl of Sefton, Rowland Egerton-Warburton of Arley Hall, George Cholmondeley, 5th Marquess of Cholmondeley, and Francis Egerton, 3rd Earl of Ellesmere. Later in his career Douglas carried out commissions for W. E. Gladstone and his family, and for W. H. Lever.

Most of the churches on which Douglas worked have been recognised as listed buildings by English Heritage, Historic Environment Scotland or, in Wales, by Cadw. In England and Wales a Grade I listed building is one "of exceptional interest, sometimes considered to be internationally important", Grade II* consists of "particularly important buildings of more than special interest", and in Grade II are buildings which "are nationally important and of special interest". There is only one Scottish church in the list; it is graded in Category A. This category contains "buildings of national or international importance, either architectural or historic, or fine little-altered examples of some particular period, style or building type".

Douglas' church restorations were influenced by the Oxford Movement, which advocated moving the centre of importance in the church from preaching to the sacrament of the Eucharist; from the pulpit to the altar. Consequences of this included moving the pulpit from a more central position to the side of the church, replacing box pews with open pews, creating a central aisle to give a better view of the altar, and the removal of galleries. Another consequence was that a larger chancel was required for the associated ritual. Douglas' father was a joiner by trade and it is likely that this influenced his own work. One of the hallmarks of Douglas' designs is his attention to detail, especially in respect to wooden articles, and this applies to his items of church furniture. Examples of all these features are to be found in this list, which consists of the works carried out by Douglas, alone or in conjunction with his partners, on pre-existing churches and includes restorations, additions and amendments to churches, and ecclesiastical furnishings. The details have been taken from the Catalogue of Works in the biography by Edward Hubbard. Work on churches attributed to Douglas by Hubbard on stylistic grounds together with evidence of a local association, even though they are not confirmed by other reliable evidence, are included. Where this is the case, it is stated in the Notes column. Unexecuted schemes are not included.

Key

Church restorations, alterations and furniture

See also

List of new churches by John Douglas
List of houses and associated buildings by John Douglas
List of non-ecclesiastical and non-residential works by John Douglas

References
Citations

Sources

External links

 
 Church Restorations
Douglas, John
Douglas, John
Lists of churches in Wales
Lists of buildings and structures in Cheshire